Coleophora hadrocerella is a moth of the family Coleophoridae. It is found in Tunisia and Libya.

The larvae feed on Bassia muricata species. They feed on the stem of their host plant.

References

hadrocerella
Moths described in 1952
Moths of Africa